Frank Mitchell Bradley is a United States Navy vice admiral who serves as the commander of Joint Special Operations Command  since August 10, 2022. He most recently served as the Commander of Special Operations Command Central from July 20, 2020 to July 1, 2022. Previously, he served as the Assistant Commander of the Joint Special Operations Command from 2018 to 2020.

Early life and education
Bradley was born and raised in Eldorado, Texas. He graduated from Eldorado High School in 1987 and was accepted to the United States Naval Academy in Annapolis, Maryland, where he had studied physics and was a varsity gymnast. He graduated from the academy and earned his commission in 1991.

Bradley also earned a Master of Science degree in physics from the Naval Postgraduate School in Monterey, California in December 2005, and received a provisional patent for his research in 2006. His master's thesis was entitled Transport imaging for the study of quantum scattering phenomena in next generation semiconductor devices. Bradley also received the Monterey Council Navy League Award for Highest Academic Achievement and the Naval Sea Systems Command Award for Excellence in Combat Systems for his thesis research.

Military career 
After graduating from the United States Naval Academy in 1991, he then immediately applied for SEAL selection and graduated from Basic Under Water Demolitions/SEAL training (BUD/S) with class 179 in 1992. His operational assignments from 1992 to 1999 include, assistant platoon commander and platoon commander tours at SEAL Team Four and SEAL Delivery Vehicle Team Two. He also served as an international exchange officer with the Italian COMSUBIN or Italian SEALs. In 1999 Bradley volunteered for assignment to the Naval Special Warfare Development Group (commonly known as DEVGRU or SEAL Team Six), and completed a specialized selection and training course known as green team. There he operated, rehearsed and planned classified missions and operations. At DEVGRU he also held numerous leadership positions from 1999 until 2015 that included Element Leader, Troop Commander, Squadron Operations Officer, Operations Officer, Squadron Commander, Deputy Commanding Officer and finally, Commanding Officer from 2013 to 2015. He was also among the first American and coalition troops to deploy to Afghanistan following the September 11th attacks, and he has deployed consistently since in support of the war on terror.
His staff duty from 2016 to 2018 has included service as JSOC’s J-3 Technical Operations division chief and deputy J-3; Vice Deputy Director for Global Operations for the Joint Staff J-3; Executive Officer for the Chairman of the Joint Chiefs of Staff, General Joseph F. Dunford, Jr. and the Deputy Director for CT Strategy for the Joint Staff J-5. He also served as Assistant Commander of JSOC from 2018 to 2020 before taking the post as Commander of Special Operations Command Central from 2020 to 2022. 

In May 2022, Bradley was nominated for promotion to Vice Admiral and assigned as Commander, Joint Special Operations Command. Then in August of 2022 Bradley was promoted to Vice Admiral and took command of his current post as Commander of the Joint Special Operations Command.

Awards and decorations

Personal life 

Bradley is the son of Frank M. "Pancho" Bradley, a World War II US Army Air Corps veteran. Bradley and his wife Katherine have a daughter and three sons. Their son Frank graduated from the U.S. Naval Academy in 2020.

References

External links
 

Year of birth missing (living people)
Living people
Place of birth missing (living people)
United States Naval Academy alumni
United States Navy SEALs personnel
SEAL Team Six personnel
Naval Postgraduate School alumni
Recipients of the Legion of Merit
United States Navy admirals
Recipients of the Defense Superior Service Medal